Puncturella antillana is a species of sea snail, a marine gastropod mollusk in the family Fissurellidae, the keyhole limpets.

Description
The size of the shell reaches 15 mm.

Distribution
This marine species occurs off Cuba, the Virgin Islands, St Thomas, Martinique and Brazil; on the Mid-Atlantic Ridge.

References

External links
 

Fissurellidae
Gastropods described in 1947